NGC 291 is a barred spiral galaxy in the constellation Cetus. It was discovered on September 27, 1864, by Albert Marth.

References

External links
 

0291
18640927
Cetus (constellation)
Barred spiral galaxies
003140